Nocciolini may refer to:
Nocciolini di Canzo, sweet crumbly small cookies from Canzo, Italy
Nocciolini di Chivasso, round biscuits from Chivasso, Italy
Manuel Nocciolini (born 1989), Italian footballer